"Hold On, We're Going Home" is a song by Canadian rapper Drake, featuring the R&B duo Majid Jordan. The song was produced by Noah "40" Shebib, OVO Sound's Majid Jordan and Nineteen85, and it is the second single from his third studio album, Nothing Was the Same, and was released for digital download on August 7, 2013, following the 2013 OVO Fest. It was later released to mainstream and rhythmic contemporary radio on August 13, 2013.

The song peaked at number four on the US Billboard Hot 100 and the UK Singles Chart, as well as number five on the singles chart in his native Canada. The song received positive reviews from music critics and was named the best song of 2013 by Pitchfork Media as well as number 21 on its "Best Tracks of the Decade" list. In 2021, it was listed at No. 129 on Rolling Stone's "Top 500 Greatest Songs of All Time".

Background
Before "Hold On, We're Going Home" was released, Drake had an interview with MTV News about the song during the 4th Annual OVO Fest saying, "It's me and 40 just channeling our Quincy Jones/Michael Jackson production duo,... Obviously no offense to the greats, I know we're not anywhere near that — it's just us kinda doing our thing, humbly attempting." He also added, "It's not a rap record,... It's not 'Versace,' it's not 'Started from the Bottom.' In approaching this album I was like man, it would be great if we had a record that was played at weddings in 10 years or that people that are away from their families in the Armed Forces could listen to. Something that just [has] timeless writing, timeless melody. So I did it with the group that we signed to OVO called Majid Jordan."

Music video
The music video is labeled a short film and takes place in 1985 Miami. It was directed by Bill Pope and released on September 24, 2013. In the video Drake plays a kingpin whose lover (Ashley Moore) is kidnapped by a rival gang. Throughout the video, Drake does everything in his power to rescue her from captor/mobster played by actor Micah Fitzgerald. Cameo appearances in the video included Fredo Santana, Steven Bauer, Johnny Simmons, Majid Jordan and ASAP Rocky among others.

Cover versions
The song has been covered by British artist Dev Hynes under his Blood Orange moniker, English band Arctic Monkeys, Brooklyn-based synthpop duo Holy Ghost!, The Saturdays, Lissie and Ella Henderson did a mashup of the song with John Newman's "Love Me Again". Conor Maynard did a medley with the song along Miley Cyrus's "Wrecking Ball" and Ellie Goulding's "Burn". He later performed a separate cover for the song. In May 2014, The Voice contestant Christina Grimmie sang the song during the sixth season of the show. In June 2014, Foster the People also covered the song on BBC Radio 1's Live Lounge. In September 2014, Nick Mulvey also delivered an acoustic rendition of the song on BBC Radio 1's Live Lounge. American singer Pia Mia also made a cover of the song and it went viral gaining over 10 million views.

In 2015, on the voice Australia Nathan Hawes did an acoustic version of this.

On 2020-04-03 UK Artist Nerina Pallot released a compilation of the lockdown sessions covers titled "Best In Show" featuring "Hold On, We're Going Home" on track 6.

Commercial performance
"Hold On, We're Going Home" debuted at number five on the US Billboard Hot R&B/Hip-Hop Songs chart, making it Drake's thirty-third top 10 hit on the chart. This accomplishment broke the tie for second-most top ten hits with singer R. Kelly, only trailing behind rapper Lil Wayne, who has 36. The song also made the top ten in the Canadian Hot 100, peaking at number five, making it his highest-charting single in his home country. In the song's fifth week on the US Billboard Hot 100, it became Drake's 13th top ten hit, climbing at number eight. This feat gave him the most top ten hits of the year with four, including "Fuckin' Problems" (number 8), "Started from the Bottom" (number 6), and "Love Me" (number 9). The song reached number four on the Billboard Hot 100 chart, becoming Drake's first song to reach the top five of the Hot 100 since "Find Your Love". The song peaked at number one on the Billboard Hot R&B/Hip-Hop Songs chart. It sold over two million copies as of January 2014.

The song sold 207,000 copies in Canada in 2013.

The single reached a peak of number four in the United Kingdom, giving Drake his highest-peaking single there at the time ("One Dance" later reached number one in 2016). It also received heavy rotation on South African radio stations, peaking a number one on the South African Airplay Chart.

Track listing

Charts

Weekly charts

Year-end charts

Decade-end charts

Certifications

Release history

See also
List of number-one singles of 2013 (South Africa)

References

Drake (musician) songs
Majid Jordan songs
2013 singles
2013 songs
Cash Money Records singles
OVO Sound singles
Republic Records singles
Contemporary R&B ballads
Song recordings produced by Majid Jordan
Song recordings produced by Nineteen85
Songs written by Drake (musician)
Songs written by Jordan Ullman
Songs written by Majid Al Maskati
Songs written by Nineteen85
South African Airplay Chart number-one singles
Synth-pop ballads